CA-30 may refer to:

 California's 30th congressional district
 California State Route 30
 CAC CA-30, an Australian variant of the Aermacchi MB-326 light military jet trainer
 Jiefang CA-30, a Chinese military truck based on the ZIL-157
 , a United States Navy heavy cruiser